Legislative Assembly elections were held in 1980, to elect members to the Bihar Legislative Assembly. After the elections, the Congress emerged as the largest party, and Jagannath Mishra was sworn in as the Chief Minister of Bihar. Later, Chandrashekhar Singh became the Chief Minister from 14 August 1983 to 12 March 1985.

Results 
Source: ECI

Elected members

References

1980
1980
Bihar